Into Existence is the first full-length album by the Canadian rock band Rides Again. It was released on October 2, 2007, with the first single being "Wonder Why" which was produced by Gavin Brown, known for also producing for Billy Talent and Three Days Grace. Videos and singles followed for Infected and It's Too Late, which received play on MuchMoreMusic. "Infected" became a top 10 modern rock hit in Canada.

Track listing

Bonus Tracks (Japanese Import)

Singles
"Wonder Why"
"Infected"
"It's Too Late"

Personnel
Chad Peyton - vocals, bass guitar
Mike McElroy - drums
Nathan Peyton - vocals, guitar
Pete Lesperance - acoustic guitar
Produced by Rides Again, Eric Ratz, Gavin Brown and Harry Hess
Engineered by Chad Peyton, Eric Ratz and Harry Hess

References

2007 albums
Hollowick albums